{{DISPLAYTITLE:C4H9NO2S}}
The molecular formula C4H9NO2S may refer to:

 Homocysteine, a non-proteinogenic α-amino acid
 S-Methylcysteine, amino acid with the nominal formula CH3SCH2CH(NH2)CO2H; the S-methylated derivative of cysteine